Kosmos 6 ( meaning Cosmos 6), also known as DS-P1 No.1 as part of the Dnepropetrovsk Sputnik programme and occasionally in the West as Sputnik 16 was a prototype radar target satellite for anti-ballistic missile tests, which was launched by the Soviet Union in 1962.

Spacecraft
It was the sixth satellite to be designated under the Kosmos system, and the second spacecraft launched as part of the DS programme to successfully reach orbit, after Kosmos 1. Its primary mission was to demonstrate the necessary technologies for radar tracking of spacecraft, which would allow future satellites to function as targets. It was the first solar-powered satellite manufactured by Yuzhnoye.

Mission
It was launched aboard the seventh flight of the Kosmos-2I 63S1 rocket. The launch was conducted from Mayak-2 at Kapustin Yar, and occurred at 16:00:00 GMT on 30 June 1962. It decayed on 8 August 1962.

Kosmos 6 was a prototype DS-P1 satellite, the first of four to be launched. Of the other three satellites, one was lost in a launch failure on 6 April 1963, and the remaining two successfully reached orbit as Kosmos 19 and Kosmos 25.

See also

 1962 in spaceflight

References

Spacecraft launched in 1962
1962 in the Soviet Union
Kosmos 0006
Spacecraft which reentered in 1962
Dnepropetrovsk Sputnik program